Pokémon Adventures, known in Japan as , is a Japanese manga series published by Shogakukan. The story arcs of the series are based on most of the Pokémon video games released by Nintendo and, as such, the main characters of the series have the name of their video game. Since the manga is based on the video games, there are some delays with the serialization since the authors need to have seen the games in order to continue with the plot.

The series is written by Hidenori Kusaka, it is illustrated by Mato during the first nine volumes, while Satoshi Yamamoto starts illustrating it since the tenth volume. The Japanese publisher Shogakukan has been releasing the individual chapters in tankōbon format with the first one being released on August 8, 1997 and currently, 52 tankōbon have been released. 

The distributing company Viz Media has licensed the series for English in the United States. Viz released the first seven volumes of the series in tankōbon format from July 6, 2000 to January 2003 as well as in magazine format. During 2006 they released two volumes with the name of The Best of Pokémon Adventures which are various chapters from the first two arcs put into one book. On June 1, 2009, Viz restarted publishing the tankōbon volumes, and are now up to volume 9 as of October 2010. Volume 10 is scheduled for December 2010, and volumes 11, 12 and volume 30 of the DP arc (known as volume 1 of Platinum in Viz's release) are all scheduled for 2011 as well. However, these releases feature both visual and dialogue edits not found in the original English release and original Japanese tankobon release.

Volume list

Volumes 21–40
Ruby & Sapphire chapter

FireRed & LeafGreen chapter

Emerald chapter

 

Diamond, Pearl & Platinum chapter

References

External links
 Official Pokémon Adventures website of Viz Media
 Official Pokémon Adventures website 

Adventures (21-40)